Wielecki Potok (German: Der schwarze Bach), also known as Wałęcki Potok,  is a stream in Poland. The stream is around 7 km long. The stream begins in the Devil's Swamp in the Warsaw Hills at the base of the Wielecka hil, near the abandoned village Goślice. The stream flows into Pilchowskie Swamp, through Ueckermünde Heath, and by the Polish village Pilchowo. Near Pilchowo, the stream marks the boundary between Pilchowo's urban and rural administrative divisions.

Rivers of Poland